Ilya Ilyich Datunashvili (1 September 1937 – 11 February 2022) was a Soviet Georgian football player. Among his many achievements, there is one for which he is remembered most often: He scored five goals in a 5–0 away win against Dinamo Tbilisi's Soviet-time arch-rivals Ararat Yerevan of Armenia. He died on 11 February 2022, at the age of 84.

Honours
Dinamo Tbilisi
 Soviet Top League: 1964; third place 1962, 1967

Individual
 Soviet Top League top scorer: 20 goals (1966)
 Top-33 season best players list: 1964, 1966 (both #2)

References

External links
 

1937 births
2022 deaths
People from Kobuleti
Soviet footballers
Footballers from Georgia (country)
Association football forwards
Soviet Top League players
FC Guria Lanchkhuti players
FC Torpedo Kutaisi players
FC Dinamo Tbilisi players